The Mid-Anglia Constabulary was the territorial police force responsible for law enforcement in part of the East of England, from 1965 to 1974. It was created from the amalgamation of five forces. It was renamed Cambridgeshire Constabulary in 1974.

History: 1965–1974
On 1 April 1965, the former Cambridgeshire Constabulary amalgamated with Cambridge City Police (called Cambridge Borough Police until 1951), Isle of Ely Constabulary, Huntingdonshire Constabulary, and the Peterborough Combined Police (created in 1947 from a merger of the Liberty of Peterborough Constabulary and the Peterborough City Police) to form the Mid-Anglia Constabulary, with the same boundaries as the current force. This force initially had an establishment of 805 and an actual strength of 728. A separate Wisbech Borough Police had already merged with the Isle of Ely Constabulary in 1889.

Chief Constable of The Mid-Anglia Constabulary

1965–1974 Frederick Drayton Porter OBE, QPM. Formerly the chief constable of Cambridgeshire and Cambridge City.

See also
 Policing in the United Kingdom

References

Defunct police forces of England
Local government in Cambridgeshire
1965 establishments in England
Government agencies established in 1965